Hamed Habibi (born in 1978) is an Iranian poet and writer.

Published works

Short stories
 The Moon and Cooper, 2005, Nashr-e-Markaz, 
 Where Flat Tire Repairing is Done , 2008, Entesharat-e-Qoqnoos,  
  The Buddha of Gerdbad Restaurant, 2011, Nashr-e-Cheshmeh,  
 Fish's Eyelid , 2016, Nashr-e-Cheshmeh

Poems
 Wandering, 2005, Nashr-e-Sales, 
 An Adjusted Death , 2014, Nashr-e-Morvarid,

Novels
 km 11 Old Route from Urmia to Salmas *  , 2017, Nashr-e-heshmeh,

Young adult's and children literature
 Don't wanna grow tall, 2006, Entesharat-e-Elmi-va-Farhangi, 
 The horn that got Croup , 2008, Entesharat-e-Elmi-va-Farhangi,  
 The worm who wanted to be a photographer, 2008, Entesharat-e-Elmi-va-Farhangi,  
 The thousand and second night2013, Co-writer: Mehdi Fatehi(writer), Entesharat-e-Chekkeh,

Awards
The Buddha of Gerdbad Restaurant was selected as the best short story collection of the year 2011 by Haft Eghlim Literary Awards. Habibi's Where Flat Tire Repairing is Done and Peyman Ecsmaeili's Snow and the Cloudy Symphony were the chosen short story collections of Hooshang Golshiri Literary Awards in 2009. In 2005,The Moon and Cooper won the special prize of Isfahan Literary Awards.  Hamed Habibi and Mehdi Fatehi won the silver medal at The Flying Turtle Awards 3d Annual for The thousand and second night.

References

1978 births
Living people
Iranian male novelists
Iranian novelists
Iranian male short story writers
20th-century Iranian poets
21st-century Iranian poets